The Nenana River is a tributary of the Tanana River, approximately  long, in central Alaska in the United States. It drains an area on the north slope of the Alaska Range on the south edge of the Tanana Valley southwest of Fairbanks.

It issues from the Nenana Glacier in the northern Alaska Range, southwest of Mount Deborah, approximately 100 mi (160 km) south of Fairbanks. It flows briefly southwest, then west, then north, forming the eastern boundary of Denali National Park and Preserve. The Tanana River continues to its confluence with the Yukon River.

The upper valley of the river furnishes approximately 100 mi (160 km) of the northern route of both the Alaska Railroad and the Parks Highway (Alaska State Highway 3) connecting Fairbanks and Anchorage.

The Nenana supports populations of Alaska blackfish, Arctic grayling, Arctic lamprey, broad whitefish, burbot, chum salmon, humpback whitefish, king salmon, lake chubs, least cisco, longnose suckers, northern pike, round whitefish, sheefish, silver salmon, and slimy sculpins. Major archaeological sites located in the valley include Broken Mammoth and Swan Point, of late Pleistocene age.

Name origin
Lieutenant Henry Allen of the U.S. Army explored the river in 1887. He named it the Cantwell River after Lieutenant John C. Cantwell, of the Revenue Cutter Service, who had explored the Kobuk River region in 1884–85. In 1898, members of the United States Geological Survey reported that people living along the river called it Tutlut. However, the local Tanana name was spelled Nenana on a later map. A century later, linguist William Bright wrote that the river's name derived from the Lower Tanana (Athabascan) word, neenano', meaning the "stopping-while-migrating stream".

Boating
The river is one of the most popular destinations for boating and whitewater rafting in Alaska. Thousands of users, some on commercial cruises and others on private trips, travel on the river each year.

The river begins as a Class I (easy) rafting stream on the International Scale of River Difficulty. Jetboats and other craft ply the waters along the Denali Highway. The most difficult whitewater, for experts only, occurs over the next , in Nenana Gorge between McKinley Village and Healy, and is rated Class IV (very difficult). Below this, the river is Class I or II all the way to Nenana.

Dangers include extremely cold swift water, Class IV rapids in the gorge, overhanging trees along the upper river, and overhangs, logjams, and braids on the lower river. An additional danger at the river mouth involves following the wrong braid, missing the take-out at Nenana, and being swept into the Tanana River, from which it may not be possible to exit until reaching Manley Hot Springs,  further downstream.

Crossings

See also
List of rivers of Alaska

References

External links

Nenana Wildwater Festival
Fairbanks Paddlers

Alaska Range
Rivers of Denali Borough, Alaska
Rivers of Matanuska-Susitna Borough, Alaska
Rivers of Alaska
Rivers of Yukon–Koyukuk Census Area, Alaska
Tributaries of the Yukon River
Rivers of Unorganized Borough, Alaska
Tanana Athabaskans